Joe Gonzales is an American attorney and politician who is the Bexar County criminal district attorney, defeating Tylden Shaeffer in the general election. Gonzales became the Democratic candidate after defeating incumbent district attorney Nico LaHood in the March 6 Democratic primary. Before his election, Gonzales was an attorney practicing at Joe Gonzales & Associates, P.C. Gonzales was re-elected to a second term in 2022.

References

Lawyers from San Antonio
Living people
American lawyers
Year of birth missing (living people)